Georges Kugelmann (1809–1882) was born in Kassel, where he served his apprenticeship as a compositor. Soon after, he went to Paris, where he was employed in the office of Ambroise Firmin-Didot. After trying publishing, he entered into a partnership with Mr. d'Aubusson and established a small print shop in the Passage des Panoramas and later at rue Feydeau in the 2nd arrondissement in Paris.

In the course of a few years, his partner died. After being naturalized as a French citizen, Kugelmann started printing business on his own account. He finally established his Imprimerie Kugelmann at 13, Rue de la Grange-Batelière (9th arrondissement). He was the printer of the French principal newspapers Le Gaulois and Le Figaro, as well as the other important weekly and daily publications. His wife Helena Kugelmann (née Pfeiffer, 1821–1900) survived him. His son Josef Kugelmann (1844–1902) succeeded him after his death. Georges Kugelmann-Benda (1883–1954) a distinguished artist and scene decorator, was Georges Kugelmann's grandson. They are all buried at Père Lachaise Cemetery in Paris.

References

1809 births
1882 deaths
19th-century printers
People from Kassel
Typographers and type designers